Turning the other cheek is a phrase in Christian doctrine from the Sermon on the Mount that refers to responding to insult without retort and allowing more insult. This passage is variously interpreted as accepting one's predicament, commanding nonresistance or advocating Christian pacifism.

Scriptural references
The phrase originates from the Sermon on the Mount in the New Testament. In the Gospel of Matthew chapter 5, an alternative for "an eye for an eye" is given by Jesus:

In the Sermon on the Plain in the Gospel of Luke chapter 6, as part of his command to "love your enemies", Jesus says:

Interpretations
This phrase, as with much of the Sermon on the Mount, has been subject to both literal and figurative interpretations.

Christian anarchist interpretation 

According to this interpretation the passages call for total nonresistance to the point of facilitating aggression against oneself, and since human governments defend themselves by military force, some have advocated Christian anarchism, including Leo Tolstoy who elucidated his reasoning in his 1894 book The Kingdom of God Is Within You.

Nonviolent resistance interpretation
The scholar Walter Wink, in his book Engaging the Powers: Discernment and Resistance in a World of Domination, interprets the passage as ways to subvert the power structures of the time.

At the time of Jesus, says Wink, striking backhand a person deemed to be of lower socioeconomic class was a means of asserting authority and dominance. If the persecuted person "turned the other cheek," the discipliner was faced with a dilemma: The left hand was used for unclean purposes, so a back-hand strike on the opposite cheek would not be performed. An alternative would be a slap with the open hand as a challenge or to punch the person, but this was seen as a statement of equality. Thus, by turning the other cheek, the persecuted was demanding equality.

Wink continues with an interpretation of handing over one's cloak in addition to one's tunic. The debtor has given the shirt off his back, a situation forbidden by Hebrew law as stated in Deuteronomy (24:10–13). By giving the lender the cloak as well, the debtor was reduced to nakedness. Wink notes that public nudity was viewed as bringing shame on the viewer, and not just the naked, as seen in Noah's case (Genesis 9:20–23).

Wink interprets the succeeding verse from the Sermon on the Mount as a method for making the oppressor break the law. The commonly invoked Roman law of Angaria allowed the Roman authorities to demand that inhabitants of occupied territories carry messages and equipment the distance of one mile post, but prohibited forcing an individual to go further than a single mile, at the risk of suffering disciplinary actions. In this example, the nonviolent interpretation sees Jesus as placing criticism on an unjust and hated Roman law, as well as clarifying the teaching to extend beyond Jewish law.

Eckhart Tolle's Interpretation 
Eckhart Tolle interprets many teachings of Jesus Christ as speaking of an experience of Mindfulness. In his book, The Power of Now: A Guide to Spiritual Enlightenment  he wrote that "This is the miracle of surrender. You may have heard the phrase "turn the other cheek," which a great teacher of enlightenment used 2,000 years ago. He was attempting to convey symbolically the secret of nonresistance and nonreaction. In this statement, as in all his others, he was concerned only with your inner reality, not with the outer conduct of your life."

See also

 Brotherly love (philosophy)
 Christian pacifism
 Live by the sword, die by the sword
 Matthew 5:29, Matthew 10
 Tolstoyan
 Violence begets violence
 Law of attraction (New Thought)
 Just war theory
 Mindfulness
 Acceptance and commitment therapy

References

Further reading
 Jim Douglass, Lightning from East to West: Jesus, Gandhi, and the nuclear age, 1983

External links
 Christian Nonviolence
 The Limits of "Turn The Other Cheek"

Doctrines and teachings of Jesus
Christian nonviolence
Christian terminology
Ethical principles
New Testament words and phrases
Sermon on the Mount
Gospel of Matthew
Matthew 5
Nonviolence
Pacifism